State Route 179 (SR 179) is a  state highway that serves as a north-south connection between western Etowah County and Boaz. The southern terminus of SR 179 is at its intersection with US 278, and the northern terminus is at its intersection with SR 168 southwest of downtown Boaz.

Route description
State Route 179 begins at its intersection with US-278 in Howelton. From this point, the route travels in a northerly direction through its northern terminus at SR-168 southwest of Boaz.

Major intersections

See also

 List of state highways in Alabama

References

External links

179
Transportation in Etowah County, Alabama
Transportation in Marshall County, Alabama